Lotta Erlman (born 29 May 1968) is a Swedish table tennis player. She competed in the women's singles event at the 1992 Summer Olympics.

References

External links
 

1968 births
Living people
Swedish female table tennis players
Olympic table tennis players of Sweden
Table tennis players at the 1992 Summer Olympics
People from Borlänge Municipality
Sportspeople from Dalarna County
20th-century Swedish women